Zygmunt Schmidt (born 27 April 1941) is a Polish footballer. He played in thirteen matches for the Poland national football team from 1966 to 1969.

References

External links
 

1941 births
Living people
Polish footballers
Poland international footballers
Place of birth missing (living people)
Association footballers not categorized by position